The Jim Mahon Memorial Trophy is awarded annually by the Ontario Hockey League since 1972, to the right winger who scores the most points in the regular season. The Peterborough Petes donated the Jim Mahon Memorial Trophy in his memory to the top scoring right winger in the Ontario Hockey League.

Jim Mahon (February 1952 – August 19, 1971) was a Canadian junior ice hockey player. He was born and raised in Maidstone, Ontario, and played minor hockey Essex, Ontario. He played for the Parry Sound Brunswicks in the 1968–69 season, winning the Georgian Bay Junior C League championship. Mahon moved up to the Peterborough Petes for the 1969–70 season, scoring 28 goals, 20 assists, and 48 points as a rookie in 46 games. In the 1970–71 season, he scored 45 goals, 44 assists, and 89 points in 62 games. In the summer of 1971, Mahon died in an electrical accident at his uncle's home in Maidstone. Mahon would have been eligible for the 1972 NHL Amateur Draft.

Winners
List of winners of the Jim Mahon Memorial Trophy.

See also
 List of Canadian Hockey League awards

References

External links
 Ontario Hockey League
 Jim Mahon statistics

Awards established in 1972
Ontario Hockey League trophies and awards